Ratu Etuate Tavai (1958 -1999) served as Attorney General of Fiji from 1996 to 1999. He also served as a Senator.

He was called to eternal rest on 11 October 1999 at the relative young age of 41.

Ratu Tavai was born on 20 February 1958 at Lautoka, Fiji. He hailed from the chiefly village of Viseisei, Vuda and was a son of the paramount chiefly family of the Vanua of Vuda.

He started his education at Vuda District School and later attended Lelean Memorial School. He pursued his tertiary studies at the University of the South Pacific, Laucala Campus. He then attended the University of Auckland, where he attained his Bachelor of Arts and Bachelors of Law.

He began his legal career as a prosecutor at the Office of the Director of Public Prosecution. He then gained further legal experience in the private and public sector.

Ratu Tavai was first elected in Parliament in 1992 and served as Minister of State in the Prime Minister's Office. Subsequent appointments included Minister for Information, Broadcasting and Telecommunications between 1995 and 1996 before being appointed as Attorney-General in 1996, a position he held until May, 1999.

During his time as Attorney-General, he achieved a number of milestones:

- He facilitated the enactment of the 1997 Constitution of Fiji.

- A record number of Bills went through Parliament during his tenure.

- He was instrumental in ensuring that the legal profession continued to maintain high standards and successfully saw the enactment of the Legal Practitioners Act, Trust Accounts Act and the Legal Aid Act.

- The first Attorney-General's Conference was held through his guidance.

- Quite controversial, he also refused to legalize same-sex marriage and other homosexual relationships.

Ratu Tavai was survived by his wife and two daughters.

References

Attorneys-general of Fiji
1999 deaths
Members of the House of Representatives (Fiji)
Members of the Senate (Fiji)
1958 births